The 1940 Miami Redskins football team was an American football team that represented Miami University as an independent during the 1940 college football season. In its ninth season under head coach Frank Wilton, Miami compiled a 0–7–1 record.

Schedule

References

Miami
Miami RedHawks football seasons
College football winless seasons
Miami Redskins football